Lee A. Saunders is a leader of the labor movement in the United States. He was elected to succeed Gerald W. McEntee as President of the 1.6 million-member American Federation of State, County and Municipal Employees (AFSCME), one of the largest and most politically active unions in the AFL-CIO, on June 21, 2012, during the union's 40th International Convention in Los Angeles. Saunders served as Secretary-Treasurer of AFSCME from 2010 to 2012.

Life and career
The son of a city bus driver, Saunders grew up in a union household in Cleveland, Ohio. He joined the Ohio Civil Service Employees Association (OCSEA) in 1974 when he began working for the Ohio Bureau of Employment Services. In 1978, he began his career with AFSCME as a labor economist, serving in the capacities of Assistant Director of Research and Collective Bargaining Services, Director of Community Action and Deputy Director of Organizing and Field Services. He served as administrator of a number of AFSCME councils across the country, including AFSCME District Council 37, New York's largest public employee union, representing 125,000 members.

Saunders serves as a vice president of the AFL-CIO Executive Council and was named chair of the labor federation's Political Committee on August 1, 2012. He is an at-large member of the Democratic Party (United States) National Committee, treasurer of the Leadership Conference on Civil and Human Rights and president of Working America.

He holds a Bachelor of Arts degree from Ohio University and a Master of Arts degree from Ohio State University. He was awarded an honorary doctorate in Humane Letters by the College of New Rochelle in 2002.

Saunders and his wife Lynne live in Washington, D.C. They have two sons, Lee Jr. and Ryan.

References

External links
Lee Saunders biography

Year of birth missing (living people)
Living people
People from Cleveland
Trade unionists from Ohio
American Federation of State, County and Municipal Employees people
Ohio University alumni
Ohio State University alumni